Events in 1985 in animation.

Events

January
 January 23: The first episode of ThunderCats airs.

March
 March 1: Will Vinton's The Adventures of Mark Twain is first released. which will become a cult classic.
 March 4: The first episode of The World of David the Gnome airs.
 March 22: He-Man and She-Ra: The Secret of the Sword is first released, the first animated feature based on a toy line.
 March 24: The Care Bears Movie is first released.
 March 25: 57th Academy Awards: Charade by Jon Minnis wins the Academy Award for Best Animated Short.

May
 May 8–19: 1986 Cannes Film Festival: Jiří Barta's The Pied Piper premiers.
 The Norwegian band A-ha releases a re-recorded version of their song Take On Me, with a partially animated music video, in which a girl is brought into a comic book world. The video is directed by Steve Barron and Candace Reckinger, with the animation done by Michael Patterson. The comic featured in the music video is drawn by Michael Patterson and later printed in the sleeve of the single release.

June
 June: Studio Ghibli is founded.
 Richard Condie's The Big Snit is released.

July
 July 4: The first episode of The Raccoons airs.
 July 24: The Walt Disney Company releases The Black Cauldron.

September
 September 7: The first episodes of Ewoks and Star Wars: Droids air, both based on Star Wars.
 September 14:
 The first episode of Hulk Hogan's Rock 'n' Wrestling airs, based on popular wrestler Hulk Hogan.
 The first episodes of The Wuzzles and Gummi Bears air. They are Walt Disney Company's first animated television series.
 The first episode of The Care Bears airs.

October
 October 3: The first episode of Seabert airs.

November
 November 15: Rainbow Brite and the Star Stealer is first released.
 November 22: Starchaser: The Legend of Orin premiers, the first animated feature film released in 3-D.

December
 December 10: Bugs Bunny receives a star at the Hollywood Walk of Fame.
 December 11: The third Astérix film Asterix Versus Caesar is released.
 December 14: The film Peter-No-Tail in America is released.

Specific date unknown
 The computer animation company H.K. Screen Art is established in Hong Kong.

Films released

 January 1 - Happy Days of the Moomins (Poland)
 January 17 - Ttoriwa Jeta Roboteu (South Korea)
 January 21 - Greed (Japan)
 January 26 - Urusei Yatsura 3: Remember My Love (Japan)
 February 6 - Gwen, the Book of Sand (France)
 March 1:
 The Adventures of Mark Twain (United States)
 Leda: The Fantastic Adventure of Yohko (Japan)
 March 9:
 Bobby's Girl (Japan)
 The Dagger of Kamui (Japan)
 Megazone 23 (Japan)
 March 16:
 Doraemon: Nobita's Little Star Wars (Japan)
 Gon, the Little Fox (Japan)
 Gu Gu Ganmo (Japan)
 Kinnikuman: Justice Supermen vs. Ancient Supermen (Japan)
 Nicholas Nickleby (Australia)
 March 20 - Sangokushi (Japan)
 March 22 - The Secret of the Sword (United States)
 March 26 - The Pickwick Papers (Australia)
 March 29 - The Care Bears Movie (Canada and United States)
 April 11 - Szaffi (Hungary, (Canada, and West Germany)
 April 27 - GoShogun: The Time Étranger (Japan)
 May 14 - Epic (Australia)
 May 25 - Here Come the Littles (United States, France, Canada, Japan, and Luxembourg)
 June 15 - Creamy Mami, the Magic Angel: Long Goodbye (Japan)
 June 20 - Dot and the Koala (Australia)
 June 27 - We Called Them Montagues and Capulets (Bulgaria)
 July 5 - Karuizawa Syndrome (Japan)
 July 13:
 The Adventures of Robin Hood (Australia)
 Captain Tsubasa: Europe Daikessen (Japan)
 Lupin III: Legend of the Gold of Babylon (Japan)
 Night on the Galactic Railroad (Japan)
 July 20:
 Area 88: The Movie (Japan)
 Cosmo Police Justy (Japan)
 Micro Commando Diatron 5 (Japan)
 Robot King Sun Shark (South Korea)
 July 21 - Little Memole: Marielle's Jewelbox (Japan)
 July 22 - Penguin's Memory: Shiawase Monogatari (Japan)
 July 24 - The Black Cauldron (United States)
 July 26 - The Man in the Iron Mask (Australia)
 July 28 - Magical Princess Minky Momo – La Ronde in my Dream (Japan)
 July 29 - The Little Vagabond (Spain)
 August 5 - Dallos Special (Japan)
 August 10 - Odin: Photon Sailer Starlight (Japan)
 August 13 - Dokgo Tak 3 – The Mound Rediscovered (South Korea)
 August 21 - Armored Trooper Votoms: The Last Red Shoulder (Japan)
 August 25 - The Prince of Devil Island: The Three-Eyed One (Japan)
 September - The Pied Piper (Czechoslovakia)
 September 5 - Odyssea (Czechoslovakia and East Germany)
 September 24 - Urusei Yatsura: Ryoko's September Tea Party (Japan)
 October 1 - Pohádky pod sněhem (Czechoslovakia)
 October 6 - Bigfoot and the Muscle Machines (United States)
 October 19:
 A Journey Through Fairyland (Japan)
 The Robot Corps and Mecha 3 (South Korea)
 October 20 - Molly and the Skywalkerz: Happily Ever After (United States)
 November 6 - You're a Good Man, Charlie Brown (United States)
 November 15 - Rainbow Brite and the Star Stealer (United States and France)
 November 22 - Starchaser: The Legend of Orin (United States and South Korea)
 November 25 - What's Michael? (Japan)
 December 11 - Asterix Versus Caesar (France and Belgium)
 December 14 - Peter-No-Tail in Americat (Sweden)
 December 15 - Angel's Egg (Japan)
 December 16:
 Fire Tripper (Japan)
 Love Position – The Legend of Halley (Japan)
 December 17:
 20,000 Leagues Under the Sea (Australia)
 The Life & Adventures of Santa Claus (United States and Japan)
 December 20 - Dirty Pair: Affair of Nolandia (Japan)
 December 21:
 Captain Tsubasa: Ayaushi, Zen Nippon Jr. (Japan)
 Kinnikuman: Hour of Triumph! Justice Superman (Japan)
 Mujeokcheorin lamboteu (South Korea)
 The Snow Country Prince (Japan)
 Vampire Hunter D (Japan)
 December 25 - He-Man & She-Ra: A Christmas Special (United States)
 Specific date unknown:
 The Brave Frog's Greatest Adventure (United States and Japan)
 Kalabaza tripontzia (Spain)
 Mach and Sebestova – Come Up to the Blackboard! (Czechoslovakia)
 The Monkey King Conquers the Demon (China)
 Robby the Rascal (Japan)
 The Secrets of a Wicker Bay (Poland)
 Time Patrol (Japan)
 Vampires in Havana (Cuba and Spain)

Television debuts

 January 3 - The Little Green Man debuts on ITV.
 January 6 - Princess Sara debuts on Fuji TV.
 March 2 - Mobile Suit Zeta Gundam debuts on Nagoya TV, TV Asahi, Animax.
 March 4 - Robotech debuts in syndication, Sci-Fi Channel, Cartoon Network & KTEH.
 March 10 - High Step Jun debuts on TV Asahi.
 March 24 - Touch debuts on Fuji TV.
 March 30 - CBS Storybreak debuts on CBS.
 April 1 - Bertha debuts on BBC 1/BBC 2.
 April 2:
 Onegai! Samia-don debuts on NHK.
 Pro Golfer Saru debuts on TV Asahi.
 April 5 - Dancouga – Super Beast Machine God debuts on TBS.
 April 6 - Honō no Alpen Rose: Judy & Randy debuts on Fuji TV.
 April 8 - Hēi! Bumbū debuts on NHK.
 April 18 - Musashi no Ken debuts on TV Tokyo.
 June 7 - Magical Emi, the Magic Star debuts on NTV.
 July 4 - The Raccoons debuts on CBC.
 July 15 - Dirty Pair debuts on Nippon TV.
 September 2 - Galtar and the Golden Lance debuts in syndication.
 September 6 - Yogi's Treasure Hunt debuts in syndication.
 September 7: Scooby's Mystery Funhouse, Star Wars: Droids, Star Wars: Ewoks,The 13 Ghosts of Scooby-Doo, and The Super Powers Team: Galactic Guardians debut on ABC.
 September 9:
 Jayce and the Wheeled Warriors debuts on TF1 (France) and in syndication (United States).
 She-Ra: Princess of Power and ThunderCats debut in syndication.
 September 14:
 Adventures of the Gummi Bears debuts on NBC (1985–1989), ABC (1989–1990) and in syndication (1990–1991).
 Hulk Hogan's Rock 'n' Wrestling, Little Muppet Monsters, The Berenstain Bears, and The Wuzzles debut on CBS.
 It's Punky Brewster debuts on NBC.
 Sectaurs and The Care Bears debut in syndication.
 September 15:
 Paw Paws debuts in syndication.
 The Funtastic World of Hanna-Barbera debuts on HBTV and TBS.
 September 24 - Spartakus and the Sun Beneath the Sea debuts on Antenne 2.
 September 25 - Fingermouse debuts on BBC1.
 September 30 - M.A.S.K. debuts in syndication.
 October 2 - Clémentine debuts on Antenne 2 (now France 2).
 October 3:
 Seabert debuts on Antenne 2 & HBO.
 Aoki Ryusei SPT Layzner debuts on Nippon Television.
 October 5 - Pob's Programme debuts on Channel 4.
 October 6:
 Jem and Super Sunday debut in syndication.
 Ninja Senshi Tobikage debuts on Nippon Television.
 October 12 - High School Kimengumi debuts on Fuji TV.
 October 19 - Yume No Hoshi No Button Nose debuts on TV Asahi.
 October 26 - The World of David the Gnome debuts on TVE1.
 November 13 - Alias the Jester debuts on ITV Network (CITV).
 November 23 - Robo Story debuts on Canal+.
 November 25 - What's Michael? debuts on anime OVA.
 Specific date unknown:
 Bigfoot and the Muscle Machines debuts on Super Sunday and Super Saturday.
 Bojan the Bear debuts on TV Ljubljana 1 (1985-91) and TV Slovenia 1 (1991-99) (Slovenia), The Children's Channel (1988-94) (U.K.).
 Captain Harlock and the Queen of 1000 Years debuts in syndication.
 Fantadroms debuts on Latvijas Televīzija.

Births

January
 January 12: Danielle Judovits, American voice actress (voice of Cure March in Glitter Force, Tenten in Naruto, Naru Osaka in Sailor Moon, Kitty Pryde in Wolverine and the X-Men, Batgirl in The Batman, Big Patty in Hey Arnold!).
 January 22: Justin Hurwitz, American composer and television writer (The Simpsons).
 January 26: Arlyne Ramirez, American animator (Good Vibes, The Simpsons), storyboard artist (Cartoon Network Studios, The Simpsons), character designer (Pink Panther and Pals, Full English, The Ricky Gervais Show, Futurama, Clarence), prop designer (Clarence) and writer (Apple & Onion, Victor and Valentino).
 January 31: Rasmus Hardiker, English actor (voice of Philip in Thomas & Friends, Alfur Aldric in Hilda, Hansel in 101 Dalmatian Street, Ginger in The Queen's Corgi, Zebedee in Mary and the Witch's Flower, Prince Ivandoe in The Heroic Quest of the Valiant Prince Ivandoe).

February
 February 9: David Gallagher, American actor (voice of Oliver in Rocket Power, Seiji Amasawa in Whisper of the Heart, Ben in The Wild Thornberrys).
 February 15: Natalie Morales, American actress and director (voice of Yolanda Buenaventura and Mindy Buenaventura in BoJack Horseman, Miss Calleros in Spider-Man: Into the Spider-Verse, Lois Lane in Harley Quinn, Betty DeVille in Rugrats).
 February 21: Anthony Raspanti, American former child actor (voiced himself in The Ren & Stimpy Show episode "A Visit to Anthony").

March
 March 1: Cole Sanchez, American artist, voice actor, writer, storyboard artist, director, and producer (Adventure Time, Summer Camp Island, The Marvelous Misadventures of Flapjack, Long Live the Royals).
 March 22: Justin Masterson, American former professional baseball starting pitcher (guest starred in the Fetch! with Ruff Ruffman episode "Take Me Out to the Fashion Show").
 March 24: Jeremy Zag, French animator, entrepreneur, producer, director, and composer (Zagtoon).
 March 25: Chris Redd, American actor and comedian (voice of Denny Jones and Chauncey in Saturday Morning All Star Hits!, Singe in the Sofia the First episode "The Royal Dragon", Hypnoslumber in the Star vs. the Forces of Evil episode "A Spell with No Name", Trevor McBride in The Simpsons episode "Girls Just Shauna Have Fun", additional voices in Big Mouth).
 March 26:
 Jonathan Groff, American actor (voice of Kristoff in the Frozen franchise, Rick Sheridan in the Invincible episode "You Look Kinda Dead", Actor Playing Bart in The Simpsons episode "Bart's Not Dead").
 Francesca Marie Smith, American actress and writer (voice of Helga Pataki in Hey Arnold!, the title character in Daisy-Head Mayzie, Emily Newton in Beethoven, Leslie McGroaty in Itsy Bitsy Spider, Annie in The New Batman Adventures episode "Growing Pains").

April
 April 3: Paula Rhodes, American actress (voice of Peaches Pie in Doc McStuffins, Skipper and Stacie in Barbie: Life in the Dreamhouse, young John Constantine in the Justice League Action episode "Trick or Threat").
 April 17: Joanne Spracklen, South African actress (voice of Supergirl in Justice League Action).
 April 19: Sabrina Jalees, Canadian comedian, actress, and writer (voice of Auntie Crane in Rubble & Crew, Nadia El-Khoury in Human Resources episode "Rutgers is for Lovers").
 April 22: Kristin Fairlie, Canadian actress (voice of the title character in Little Bear, Bridgette in Total Drama, Juliet Capulet in Peg + Cat).
 April 27: Jamie Gray Hyder, American actress (voice of Zethrid in Voltron: Legendary Defender, Shayera Hol in Green Lantern: Beware My Power).
 April 30: Gal Gadot, Israeli actress and model (voice of Shank in Ralph Breaks the Internet, herself in The Simpsons episode "Bart's Not Dead").

May
 May 8: Yukiyo Fujii, Japanese actress (voice of Millianna in Fairy Tail, Sailor Saturn in season 3 of Sailor Moon Crystal, Mimi Pearlbaton in Re:Zero − Starting Life in Another World, Mana Inuyama in GeGeGe no Kitarō).

June
 June 8: Niki Yang, South Korean animator, writer, storyboard artist, (Family Guy, Adventure Time, Gravity Falls), and voice actress (voice of BMO and Lady Rainicorn in Adventure Time, Candy Chiu in Gravity Falls).
 June 12: Deneen Melody, American voice actress (voice of Zoé Lee, Kaalki, and Mullo in Miraculous: Tales of Ladybug & Cat Noir, Pandora in Re: Zero - Starting Life in Another World, Ronie Arabel and Laurannei Arabel in Sword Art Online).
 June 13: Julia Pott, British animator and voice actor (creator of and voice of Susie McCallister in Summer Camp Island).
 June 15: Carolina Ravassa, Columbian actress (voice of Cleo Leball in Power Players, Zyanya in Onyx Equinox, Carolina Grant-Gomez in Hamster & Gretel).
 June 18: Alex Hirsch, American animator, storyboard artist, writer (The Marvelous Misadventures of Flapjack, Fish Hooks, Kid Cosmic), producer (Inside Job) and voice actor (voice of King and Hooty in The Owl House, Dirk in The Mitchells vs. the Machines, Wyatt in Big City Greens, Steve in The Angry Birds Movie 2, Clamantha, Fumble, and the Fish Police in Fish Hooks, Grassy Noel Atkinson, Paul Rudd, and Justin Timberlake in Inside Job, the Curator, Frog Soos and Schmebulock in the Amphibia episode "Wax Museum", Officer Concord in the Phineas and Ferb episode "Terrifying Tri-State Trilogy of Terror", Toby Matthews in the Rick and Morty episode "Big Trouble in Little Sanchez", Soosy Du in the Wander Over Yonder episode "The Cartoon", Ben Fotino in the Star vs. the Forces of Evil episode "Skooled!", Internet Troll in the We Bare Bears episode "Charlie's Halloween Thing 2", creator and voice of Grunkle Stan, Soos Ramirez, Bill Cipher, Old Man McGucket and other various characters in Gravity Falls).
 June 22: Lindsay Ridgeway, American actress (voice of young Sally in the Sonic the Hedgehog episode "Blast to the Past", singing voice of Darla Dimple in Cats Don't Dance).

July
 July 2: Ashley Tisdale, American actress and singer (voice of Candace Flynn in Phineas & Ferb, Stealth Elf in Skylanders Academy).
 July 16: Yōko Hikasa, Japanese voice actress and singer (voice of Rias Gremory in High School DxD, Kyōko Kirigiri in the Danganronpa franchise).

September
 September 3: Shane Houghton, American comic book writer (Bongo Comics), writer (Harvey Beaks), producer and brother of Chris Houghton (co-creator of Big City Greens).
 September 4: Morgan Garrett, American voice actress (voice of Rico Brzenska in Attack on Titan, Megu Kataoka in Assassination Classroom).
 September 6: Lauren Lapkus, American actress (voice of Matilda in Penn Zero: Part-Time Hero, Patience St. Pim in Adventure Time, Mackenzie in Craig of the Creek, Lotta in Harvey Girls Forever!, Jennifer Sh'reyan in Star Trek: Lower Decks).
 September 21: Doug Rockwell, American songwriter, producer, musician and composer (Blaze and the Monster Machines, The Loud House, The Casagrandes, voiced himself and Border Guard in The Loud House episodes "Really Loud Music" and "Schooled!").
 September 22: Tatiana Maslany, Canadian actress (voice of Queen Aja Tarron in the Tales of Arcadia franchise, Mia McKibbin in the BoJack Horseman episode "Let's Find Out", Barbie in the Robot Chicken episode "Hopefully Salt", Sherman in the Animals episode "Roachella").

October
 October 3: T.J. Hill, American composer (Disney Television Animation).
 October 10: Heather Hogan, American actress (voice of Phantom Girl in Legion of Super Heroes, second voice of Ducky in The Land Before Time franchise).
 October 31: Kether Donohue, American actress (voice of Reiko Komori in The King of Braves GaoGaiGar, Shinohara in Piano: The Melody of a Young Girl's Heart, Kiki Benjamin/Mew Kiki in Mew Mew Power, Mirabelle Haywood in Magical DoReMi, Arine and Suzume Imamura in Munto 2: Beyond the Walls of Time, Emi Narasaki in Negadon: The Monster from Mars, Skuld in Ah! My Goddess, Lily in Kappa Mikey, Kuroki in Joe vs. Joe, Zoe Drake and Pterosaur in Dinosaur King, Autumn, Young Lila and Candice in Pokémon, Annie, Angela Raines and Nico in Yu-Gi-Oh! 5D's, Makana in Kurokami: The Animation, Brosalind and April in All Hail King Julien, Flo in Elena of Avalor, Gillian and Gennifer in Birdgirl, Chloe and Trench Woman in the American Dad! episode "The Long March", Ens. Peanut Hamper in the Star Trek: Lower Decks episode "No Small Parts", Sarah Connor and Party Store Vendor in the Robot Chicken episode "May Cause the Need for Speed", Tourist #2 in the Tuca & Bertie episode "Leveling Up").

November
 November 18: Christian Siriano, American fashion designer (voiced himself in The Simpsons episode "Portrait of a Lackey on Fire").
 November 23: Katie Crown, Canadian actress (voice of Izzy in Total Drama, Tulip in Storks, Ivy Sundew in Amphibia, Akila in Cleopatra in Space), and writer (Sanjay and Craig, Clarence, Bob's Burgers, Star vs. the Forces of Evil).
 November 26: Daron Nefcy, American animator, storyboard artist (Robot and Monster, Wander Over Yonder), character designer (Mad), writer, director (We the People) and producer (creator and voice of various characters in Star vs. the Forces of Evil).
 November 30: Kaley Cuoco, American actress and producer (voice of Brandy Harrington in Brandy & Mr. Whiskers, the title character in Harley Quinn).

December
 December 5:
 Kyle McCarley, American actor (voice of Shigeo Kageyama in Mob Psycho 100, Mikazuki Augus in Mobile Suit Gundam: Iron-Blooded Orphans, Shinji Mato in Fate/stay night, Ryota Watari in Your Lie in April, Killy in Blame, Narancia Ghirga in JoJo's Bizarre Adventure: Vento Aureo, Joe Shimamura in Cyborg 009: Call of Justice, Helbram in The Seven Deadly Sins, Marc Anciel in Miraculous: Tales of Ladybug & Cat Noir).
 Frankie Muniz, American actor, race car driver and musician (voice of Mosley Moville in Moville Mysteries, Willie, Augie and Tony in Fillmore!, Benjamin North in Choose Your Own Adventure: The Abominable Snowman, Thelonious in The Simpsons episode "Trilogy of Error", Frankie in the Clifford the Big Red Dog episode "Little Big Pup", himself in the Harley Quinn episode "Being Harley Quinn", first voice of Chester McBadbat in The Fairly OddParents).
 December 10: Raven-Symoné, American actress and musician (voice of Goldilocks, Zoe and Olivia in Happily Ever After: Fairy Tales for Every Child, Monique in Kim Possible, Maryanne Greene and Alexandria Quarry in Fillmore!, Marti Brewster in Everyone's Hero, Katie and Wife in American Dad!, Iridessa in Tinker Bell, Binkley in Animal Crackers, Valkyrie in Guardians of the Galaxy, Maria Media in Big City Greens, Stephanie in The Proud Family episode "Seven Days of Kwanzaa").

Deaths

January
 January 25: Paul Smith, American composer (Walt Disney Animation Studios), dies at age 78.
 January 28: Don Raye, American songwriter (Walt Disney Animation Studios), dies at age 75.

February
 February 8: Marvin Miller, American actor (narrator in Gerald McBoing-Boing and Sleeping Beauty, voice of Mr. Sun in Our Mr. Sun, Hemo in Hemo the Magnificent, Aquaman in The Superman/Aquaman Hour of Adventure,  Great Tree Chief and Master Kon in Fantastic Planet, Busby Birdwell in Fantastic Voyage, Super-Skrull in the Fantastic Four episode "Invasion of the Super-Skrull", dies at age 71.
 February 20:  Clarence Nash, American voice actor (Donald Duck), dies at age 80.
 February 27: J. Pat O'Malley, British actor (voice of Cyril Proudbottom and Winkie in The Adventures of Ichabod and Mr. Toad, Mother Oyster, The Walrus and the Carpenter and Tweedledum and Tweedledee in Alice in Wonderland, Jasper and the Colonel in 101 Dalmatians, the Cockney coster in Mary Poppins, and Colonel Hathi in The Jungle Book), dies at age 80.

March
 March 21: Michael Redgrave, British actor and director (narrator in A Christmas Carol), dies at age 77.
 March 24: Dick Kinney, American animator, screenwriter (Walter Lantz, Walt Disney Company, Terrytoons, Hanna-Barbera) and comics writer, dies at age 68.
 March 30: Harold Peary, American actor and comedian (voice of the Devil in the Private Snafu cartoon Hot Spot, Herman in The Roman Holidays, Fenwick Fuddy in The Galloping Ghost, and Yogi's Space Race, Big Ben in Rudolph's Shiny New Year and Rudolph and Frosty's Christmas in July), dies at age 76.

April
 April 5: Hannes Schroll, Austrian skier and yodeller (creator of the Goofy holler sound effect), dies at age 76.
 April 25: Richard Haydn, British actor (voice of the Caterpillar in Alice in Wonderland), dies at age 80.

May
 May 22: Wolfgang Reitherman, American animator and director (one of Disney's Nine Old Men), dies at age 75.

June
 June 20: Ralph A. Wolfe, American comic book artist and animator (Fleischer Studios, Warner Bros. Cartoons, Walt Disney Animation Studios), dies at age 90.

August
 August 2: Bob Holt, American actor (voice of the title character and Once-ler in The Lorax, Avatar in Wizards, the title characters in The Incredible Hulk and The Great Grape Ape Show, Shadow Demon in Dungeons & Dragons, Cop-Tur in Challenge of the GoBots), dies at age 56.
 August 25: Pino Zac, Italian illustrator, comics artist and animator, dies at age 55.
 August 29: Paul Kligman, Romanian-born Canadian actor (voice of J. Jonah Jameson in Spider-Man and Donner in Rudolph The Red-Nosed Reindeer), dies at age 62.

October
 October 10: Orson Welles, American film and theater director, and actor (narrator and voice of Nag and Chuchundra in Rikki-Tikki-Tavi, narrator in Bugs Bunny: Superstar, voice of Unicron in The Transformers: The Movie), dies at age 70.

November
 November 6: Viktor Kálmán, Hungarian painter, animator and comics artist (Az Okos Kapus), dies at age 74. 
 November 16: Lou Fleischer, American composer (Fleischer Studios) and actor (J. Wellington Wimpy in the Popeye cartoon I Wanna Be A Lifeguard), dies at age 94.
 November 29: Bill Scott, American actor (voice of Bullwinkle J. Moose, Mister Peabody, Dudley Do-Right, Super Chicken and George of the Jungle, Moosel in The Wuzzles, and Gruffi Gummi, Sir Tuxford, and Toadwart in Gummi Bears), dies at age 65 from a heart attack.

December
 December 19: Jean Ache/Jean Huet, French animator and comics artist (L'Émule de Tartarin, Callisto le petite nymphe, Anatole Fait Du Camping), dies at age 62.
 December 25: Joe Oriolo, American film director, producer and writer (co-creator of Casper the Friendly Ghost and Felix the Cat, worked for Fleischer Studios and Famous Studios), dies at age 72.
 Specific date unknown: Margie Hines, American actress (original voice of Betty Boop, occasional voice of Olive Oyl and Swee'Pea in Popeye), dies at age 76.

Specific date unknown
 Antoine Payen, French animator and illustrator (Les Enfants du Ciel, Cri-Cri, Ludo et l'orage), dies at age 82 or 83.
 Roberto Sgrilli, Italian painter, illustrator, comics artist and animator (Il Barone di Münchhausen, Anacleto e la Faina), dies at age 87 or 88.

See also
 1985 in anime

References

External links 
 Animated works of the year, listed in the IMDb

 
1980s in animation